Everything Is Thunder is a 1936 British thriller film directed by Milton Rosmer and starring Constance Bennett, Douglass Montgomery and Oskar Homolka. Its plot concerns a British officer who attempts to escape from a German Prisoner of War camp during the First World War.

Production
The film was based on a novel by Jocelyn Lee Hardy. It was made at Lime Grove Studios in London. The film's art direction was by Alfred Junge.

Cast
 Constance Bennett as Anna von Stucknadel 
 Douglass Montgomery as Hugh McGrath 
 Oskar Homolka as Detective Schenck Götz 
 Roy Emerton as Kostner 
 Frederick Lloyd as Muller 
 Peggy Simpson as Mitzi 
 George Merritt as Webber
 Robert Atkins as Adjutant 
 Terence Downing as Spicer 
 Clifford Bartlett as Glendhill 
 Albert Chevalier as McKenzie 
 H. F. Maltby as Burgomaster 
 Norman Pierce as Hans 
 Frederick Piper as Policeman Denker 
 Virginia Isham as War Widow

Reception
Writing for The Spectator in 1936, Graham Greene gave the film a generally good review, describing it as "good entertainment, very ably directed and admirably acted by two of its three international stars". Greene deigns to praise the starring acting of Constance Bennett, however he attributes the lack of acting to the complexities involved in avoiding the British Board of Film Censors. Comparing the novel upon which the film is based and the film itself, Greene notes the superiority of the novel over the film which lacked a psychological element, and concludes that "the book was not sentimental: the film is".

References

External links

1936 films
Films directed by Milton Rosmer
British black-and-white films
Films set in Germany
Films set in the 1910s
World War I prisoner of war films
Films shot at Lime Grove Studios
Gainsborough Pictures films
Films based on British novels
Films scored by Jack Beaver
1930s English-language films
1930s British films